The autumn internationals, November internationals, end-of-year tests, and spring internationals/tour for Australia and New Zealand, are men's rugby union Test matches that are contested around November each year. It is organised by World Rugby. Teams from European national teams generally play at home against visiting teams from the Southern Hemisphere. Second-tier national teams, such as those from North American and Pacific countries also usually have games. 

Each team typically plays three or four Test matches, and visiting teams may also play games against non-national teams, such as provinces or clubs, as part of a tour. One of the major Southern Hemisphere teams (Australia, New Zealand, South Africa or Argentina) often plays against the invitational Barbarians club in the traditional 'Final Challenge', usually at Twickenham in London.

The Grand Slam

A touring nation may also have the opportunity to complete a Grand Slam by beating the four home unions of England, Ireland, Scotland and Wales.

See also
 Mid-year rugby union internationals

References

 
Rugby union matches